Flavius Taurus (fl. 355–361) was a politician and a military officer of the Roman Empire. He was Praetorian Prefect of Italy and Africa, and consul in 361 AD.

Biography 

His father was of humble origins. Taurus had three children, Armonius, died about 391, Eutychianus, praetorian prefect of the East and consul in 398, and Aurelianus, praetorian prefect of the East and consul in 400.

Taurus was praetorian prefect of Italy and Africa, as well as Patricius, from 355 to 361, and consul in 361. In the year of his consulate, the Caesar Julian, stationed in Gaul, was proclaimed Augustus by the troops and moved with the army against the Augustus Constantius II, who was in the East. When the news that Julian had crossed the Alps arrived in Rome, the consuls Taurus and Florentius, who supported Constantius, left the city; then Julian had them indicated in documents as fugitive consuls. Taurus was later convicted for this flight in the trial that was held at Chalcedon in 361 and sent into exile in Vercelli.

Notes

Bibliography 
 Jones, Arnold Hugh Martin, John Robert Martindale, John Morris, The Prosopography of the Later Roman Empire, Volume 1, Cambridge University Press, 1992, p. 1146

4th-century Romans
4th-century Roman consuls
Imperial Roman consuls
Praetorian prefects of Italy
Patricii